Southwood is a rural town and locality in the Western Downs Region, Queensland, Australia.

History 
The town of Southwood was surveyed on 19 February 1886 by Fred W. Barlow on the northern banks of the Moonie River within the Wild Horse Paradise pastoral run. A police station and a couple of hotels were established but the town never developed and disappeared after the police station closed in 1911.

In the  the locality of Southwood had a population of 84 people.

Road infrastructure
The Moonie Highway (State Route 49) runs through from east to south-west.

References

External links 
 

Towns in Queensland
Western Downs Region
Localities in Queensland